Oriana Gabriela Sabatini (born 19 April 1996) is an Argentine model, actress and singer.

Early life and education 
Oriana Gabriela Sabatini was born on 19 April 1996 in Buenos Aires, Argentina. She is the daughter of the entrepreneur and former Argentine actor with Italian citizenship Osvaldo Sabatini and the Venezuelan actress Catherine Fulop. She has a sister three years younger named, Tiziana Beatriz Sabatini. 

Oriana Sabatini is the niece of the renowned professional tennis player, Gabriela Sabatini. She began her artistic training at a very young age, studying singing, piano and theater. Her studies include two years at the Julio Chávez acting training Institute and one year at the New York Film Academy.

Career

Modeling career 
Her first individual modeling was at 13 for a magazine, in an article about her relationship with the mother. In 2017, she participated with the well-known brand L'Oréal doing an advertising campaign about their Casting Creme Gloss products.

Television career 
Her first television performance was in 2011 in the Uruguayan telenovela Porque te quiero así.

In 2012, she was summoned by Cris Morena to be part of the cast of Aliados. From 2013 to 2014, she was part of the cast of the youth television series Aliados. In 2014, she made the theatrical seasons of Aliados.

In 2018, she made her film debut, with the movie Perdida.

In 2018, she was the protagonist of the television series Medusa with Esteban Lamothe.

In 2019, she acted in the Spanish film ¿Qué te juegas?.

In 2019, she was the protagonist of the television series Secreto bien guardado with Victorio D'Alessandro.

In 2019, she was the protagonist of the movie Rosario: un clásico de amor y fútbol with Nicolás Furtado.

Singing career 
In April 2017, she began her solo career with the release of her first single in English, «Love Me Down Easy». Then she participated in June in the opening of the well-known program called ShowMatch conducted by Marcelo Tinelli, singing «Love Me Down Easy».

On July 5, she appeared as a backup artist on Ariana Grande Dangerous Woman Tour singing her first single «Love Me Down Easy» and two new songs: «Stay Or Run» and «What U Gonna Do».

On September 21 she appeared as a solo artist at Usina del Arte, Ciudad Emergente, a show for new artists.

On November 14 and 15 of the same year he was the opening act for the band Coldplay, who finished their A Head Full of Dream tour in Argentina, performing at the Unico Stadium in La Plata.

In 2018, she performed at the Lollapalooza Argentina festival, sharing the stage with the American band Red Hot Chili Peppers.

Personal life 
From 2014 to 2017, Sabatini was in a relationship with actor and YouTuber, Julián Serrano.

Since July 2018, Sabatini is in a relationship with Argentine professional football player, Paulo Dybala. She is openly bisexual.

Filmography

Television

Television Programs

Theater

Movies

Videoclips

Awards and nominations

Discography

Soundtrack albums 
 2013 — Aliados
 2014 — Aliados

As lead artist

Notes:

References

External links 

 "Oriana Sabatini, grandson of Gabriela and (maybe) Paulo Dybala’s girlfriend"

1996 births
Living people
Argentine television actresses
21st-century Argentine actresses
Actresses from Buenos Aires
Argentine people of Hungarian descent
Argentine people of Italian descent
Argentine people of Venezuelan descent
Argentine female models
Association footballers' wives and girlfriends
21st-century Argentine women singers